The following is a list of notable events and releases of the year 2017 in Swedish music.

Events

January
Hallåjsan

February
 4 – Melodifestivalen 2017 Semi-final 1 in Scandinavium, Gothenburg.
 11 – Melodifestivalen 2017 Semi-final 2 in Malmö Arena, Malmö.
 18 – Melodifestivalen 2017 Semi-final 3 in Vida Arena, Växjö.
 25 – Melodifestivalen 2017 Semi-final 4 in Skellefteå Kraft Arena, Skellefteå.
 28 - At Sweden's Grammis Awards ceremony, Zara Larsson receives the Artist of the Year award and Kent win both the Album of the Year and Rock Album of the Year.

March
 4 – Melodifestivalen 2017 Second chance in Saab Arena, Linköping.
 11
 Melodifestivalen 2017 Final in Friends Arena, Stockholm.
 Robin Bengtsson is selected as Sweden's representative in the Eurovision Song Contest 2017.

April
 21 – The Gamlestaden Jazzfestival opened in Gothenburg, Sweden (April 21 – 29).

May
 9 – The conductor Sofi Jeannin is appointed chief conductor of the BBC Singers, the first woman to hold the post, effective in July 2018.
 13 – In the final of the Eurovision Song Contest 2017, Sweden finish in 5th place.
 15 - The Swedish Chamber Orchestra appoints Martin Fröst its principal conductor effective from 2019, with an initial contract of 3 seasons.

June
 7 – The 25th Sweden Rock Festival started in Norje (June 7 – 10).
 28 – The 5th Bråvalla Festival opened near Norrköping (June 28 - July 1).

July

August
 11 – Malmöfestivalen opened (August 11 – 18).
 20
 Choral conductor and mezzo-soprano Sofi Jeannin makes her Proms debut, conducting the BBC Singers and City of London Sinfonia in a Reformation Day concert.

September

October
 6 – The 34th Stockholm Jazz Festival started (October 6 – 15).
 25 – The 49th Umeå Jazz Festival started (October 25 – 29).

November

December

Albums releases

January

February

March

May

June

July

September

October

November

Deaths

 January
 17 – Carina Jaarnek  singer (born 1962).
 24 – Björn Thelin, bassist for The Spotnicks, (born 1942).

 February
 1 – Robert Dahlqvist rock musician for The Hellacopters and Dundertåget, (born 1976).
 8 – Tony Särkkä, black metal musician and multiinstrumentalist of Romani descent (Abruptum, Ophthalamia) (born 1972).
 29 – Josefin Nilsson Swedish singer and actress (born 1969).

 March
 6 – Lars Diedricson, singer (Snowstorm) and songwriter ("Take Me to Your Heaven"), winner of the Eurovision Song Contest 1999 (born 1961).
 22 – Sven-Erik Magnusson, musician (Sven-Ingvars) (born 1942).

 September
 12 – Siegfried Köhler, conductor of the Royal Swedish Opera, (born 1923).
 25 – Folke Rabe, composer, (born 1935).

 October
 17 – Ingvar Lidholm, composer, (born 1921).
 20 – Boris Lindqvist, rock singer, (born 1940).

 November
 17 – Rikard Wolff, pop singer and actor (born 1958).

See also 
 2017 in Sweden
 Music of Sweden
 Sweden in the Eurovision Song Contest 2017
 List of number-one singles and albums in Sweden (see 2017 section on page)

References

 
Swedish music by year
Swedish
Music